is a Japanese manga artist, best known for his manga Black Lagoon. When he is working on doujin comics he goes by the name Red Bear. Hiroe's manga were originally published by Kadokawa Shoten in the 1990s but none were complete. As a response, Hiroe transferred to Shogakukan in the early 2000s, where all of his manga released before Black Lagoon were republished and re-released.

Works

Manga
 Hisuikyo Kitan (1992 – 1994)
 Shook Up! (1998 – 1999)
 Phantom Bullet (2000)
Black Lagoon (2002 – ongoing)
341 Sentōdan (2019 – ongoing)

Anime
 Black Lagoon (2006 – 2011) – Original creator
 Re:Creators (2017) – Original story, concept and character designer

Light novel
 Black Lagoon (2008 – 2011) – Illustrator

Art books
 Barrage
 Call Mission
 Reighborhood

References

External links
  
 
 

1972 births
Hentai creators
Living people
Manga artists from Kanagawa Prefecture